Hudeh or Howdeh may refer to:
 Hudeh, Gilan
 Hudeh, Yazd